Suttontown may refer to:
Suttontown, South Australia near Mount Gambier
Suttontown, North Carolina in Sampson County